was a town located in Ōsato District, Saitama Prefecture, Japan.

As of 2005, the town had an estimated population of 18,754 and a density of 613.07 persons per km². The total area was 30.59 km².

On January 1, 2006, Okabe, along with the towns of Hanazono and Kawamoto (all from Ōsato District), was merged into the expanded city of Fukaya.

Dissolved municipalities of Saitama Prefecture
Fukaya, Saitama